The Sardinian regional election of 2009 took place on 15–16 February 2009.

The election was called few months before the natural end of the legislature because of the resignation of the incumbent President Renato Soru. Ugo Cappellacci, the centre-right candidate, defeated Soru by a large margin.

Electoral system
The electoral system used for this election was the national Tatarella Law of 1995, used by most of Italian regions to elect their Council. Sixty-four councillors were elected in provincial constituencies by proportional representation using the largest remainder method with a Droop quota and open lists; remained seats and votes were grouped at regional level where a Hare quota is used, and then distributed to provincial party lists.

Ten councillors were elected at-large using a general ticket: parties were grouped in alliances, and the alliance which received a plurality of votes elected all its candidates, its leader becoming the President of Sardinia.

Council apportionment
According to the official 2001 Italian census, the 64 Council seats which must be covered by proportional representation were so distributed between Sardinian provinces.

It must be underlined that this allocation is not fixed. Remained seats and votes after proportional distribution, are all grouped at regional level and divided by party lists.

Results

|+ 
|-
| colspan=11|
|-
|- bgcolor="#E9E9E9"
!style="background-color:#E9E9E9" align=left rowspan=2 valign=bottom|Candidate
!colspan="3" align="center" valign=top|Regional lists
!colspan="4" align="center" valign=top|Provincial lists
! align="center" valign=top|Total
|-
|- bgcolor="#E9E9E9"
|align="center" valign=top|votes
|align="center" valign=top|%
|align="center" valign=top|seats
|align="center" valign=top|Party
|align="center" valign=top|votes
|align="center" valign=top|%
|align="center" valign=top|seats
|align="center" valign=top|group
|-
!style="background-color:lightblue" rowspan="6" align="left" valign="top"|Ugo Cappellacci
|rowspan="6" valign="top"|502,084
|rowspan="6" valign="top"|51.88
|rowspan="6" valign="top"|9

|align="left"| The People of Freedom
| align=right|248,654
| align=right|30.11
| align=right|25
| rowspan="6" align="right" valign="top"|53
|-
|align="left"| Union of the Centre
| align=right|75,451
| align=right|9.13
| align=right|7
|-
|align="left"| Sardinian Reformers
| align=right|56,056
| align=right|6.78
| align=right|5
|-
|align="left"| Sardinian Action Party
| align=right|35,428
| align=right|4.29
| align=right|4
|-
|align="left"| United Sardinia
| align=right|28,928
| align=right|3.50
| align=right|2
|-
|align="left"| Together for the Autonomies
| align=right|18,500
| align=right|2.24
| align=right|1

|-
!style="background-color:pink" rowspan="6" align="left" valign="top"|Renato Soru
|rowspan="6" valign="top"|415,600
|rowspan="6" valign="top"|42.94
|rowspan="6" valign="top"|1

|align="left"| Democratic Party
| align=right|204,223
| align=right|24.73
| align=right|18
| rowspan="6" align="right" valign="top"|27
|-
|align="left"| Italy of Values
| align=right|41,321
| align=right|5.00
| align=right|3
|-
|align="left"| Communist Refoundation Party
| align=right|26,454
| align=right|3.20
| align=right|2
|-
|align="left"| Red Moors
| align=right|21,034
| align=right|2.54
| align=right|1
|-
|align="left"| Party of Italian Communists
| align=right|15,870
| align=right|1.92
| align=right|1
|-
|align="left"| Left for Sardinia
| align=right|13,508
| align=right|1.63
| align=right|1

|-
!style="background-color:#FE6F5E" rowspan="1" align="left" valign="top"|Gavino Sale
|rowspan="1" valign="top"|29,640
|rowspan="1" valign="top"|3.06
|rowspan="1" valign="top"|-

|align="left"| Independence Republic of Sardinia 
| align=right|17,141
| align=right|2.07
| align=right|0
| rowspan="1" align="right" valign="top"|-

|-
!style="background-color:#F88379" rowspan="1" align="left" valign="top"|Peppino Balia
|rowspan="1" valign="top"|15,037
|rowspan="1" valign="top"|1.55
|rowspan="1" valign="top"|-

|align="left"| Italian Socialist Party
| align=right|19,488
| align=right|2.36
| align=right|0
| rowspan="1" align="right" valign="top"|-

|-
!style="background-color:red" rowspan="1" align="left" valign="top"|Gianfranco Sollai
|rowspan="1" valign="top"|5,316
|rowspan="1" valign="top"|0.55
|rowspan="1" valign="top"|-

|align="left"| Unidade Indipendentista (incl. SNI and aMpI)
| align=right|3,695
| align=right|0.44
| align=right|0
| rowspan="1" align="right" valign="top"|-

|- bgcolor="#E9E9E9"
!rowspan="1" align="left" valign="top"|Total candidates
!rowspan="1" align="right" valign="top"|967,677
!rowspan="1" align="right" valign="top"|100.00
!rowspan="1" align="right" valign="top"|10
!rowspan="1" align="left" valign="top"|Total parties
!rowspan="1" align="right" valign="top"|825,751
!rowspan="1" align="right" valign="top"|100.00
!rowspan="1" align="right" valign="top"|70
!rowspan="1" align="right" valign="top"|80
|}
Source: Regional Council of Sardinia</onlyinclude>

2009 elections in Italy
Elections in Sardinia
February 2009 events in Europe